Guryong station is a station on the Bundang Line of the Seoul Metropolitan Subway network in South Korea. It is in the Gaepo-dong area of the Gangnam district of Seoul. The station opened on October 24, 2004.

References

Seoul Metropolitan Subway stations
Metro stations in Gangnam District
Railway stations opened in 2004